Bank Chambers is an office building on Portland Street, Manchester, England. Its heavy and imposing appearance gives away its previous use as a bullion bank vault by the Bank of England. The Bank of England vacated the building in the 1990s and the building is now used as offices.

Background
The building was built in 1971 and designed by the architecture practice Aukett Fitzroy Robertson. The building is bomb-proof with a 16-inch exterior wall of concrete and wide cavity existed for security patrols. Every Tuesday the surrounding roads would be temporary closed to allow the transportation of money.

The building was vacated in the 1990s and office developer Bruntwood bought the building. It was subsequently renovated with Grade A office space. The existing vault space has since been converted into space for servers and data farms for companies.

References

External links

Buildings and structures in Manchester
Office buildings completed in 1971